In mathematics, polar representation may refer to:
Representations of points in the Euclidean plane via the polar coordinate system
Polar actions on Euclidean spaces